Cowan is an unincorporated community in Monroe Township, Delaware County, Indiana.

History
Cowan was founded in 1869, when the railroad was extended to that point. It was named for Charles McCowan, a longtime resident who donated funds to build a church and school building.

Overview
The Cowan Street Light Festival was an annual event held in Cowan to raise money to pay for the electricity used by the town's street lights, with most funds raised by selling booths to vendors.  However, currently the festival no longer exists. 

Public education is administered by the Cowan Community School Corporation (formerly the Monroe Community School Corporation). The elementary (K-6) was ranked 8/10. The high school (7-12) was ranked 5/10.

Geography
The Norfolk Southern Railway passes from north to south through town. Cowan is located one mile north of Oakville.

Notable people

Orville Harrold, opera singer

References

Unincorporated communities in Delaware County, Indiana
Unincorporated communities in Indiana
Populated places established in 1869
1869 establishments in Indiana